The Mauritius Labour Congress is a national trade union center in Mauritius. It was created in 1963 from a merger of the Mauritius Trade Union Congress and the Mauritius Confederation of Free Trade Unions.

The MLC is affiliated with the International Trade Union Confederation.

References

Trade unions in Mauritius
International Trade Union Confederation
Trade unions established in 1963